David Henry Argosky LeBoeuf (born May 26, 1989) is a member of the Massachusetts House of Representatives who represents the 17th Worcester District. His district is made up of the town of Leicester, including Cherry Valley and Rochdale, and the city of Worcester, including Clark University, Main South, and Webster Square. LeBoeuf serves on the House Committee on Global Warming and Climate Change, the Joint Committee on Cannabis Policy, the Joint Committee on Children, Families and Persons with Disabilities, and the Joint Committee on Consumer Protection and Professional Licensure.

Arrest
On April 26, 2022, LeBoeuf was charged with drunken driving, with a blood-alcohol level tested at 0.329, "roughly four times the legal limit." When pulled over in Quincy, Massachusetts, the state trooper asked him where he believed he was; LeBoeuf responded, "Newton." On June 21, he pleaded guilty and was sentenced to one year of probation, fined $600 (as well as $65 per month in probation fees), and was "required to complete a driver’s alcohol education course." In addition, his license was suspended for 45 days.

See also
 2019–2020 Massachusetts legislature
 2021–2022 Massachusetts legislature

References

External links
 Legislative website
 Constituent website
 Campaign website

Living people
21st-century American politicians
Democratic Party members of the Massachusetts House of Representatives
Harvard University alumni
People from Worcester, Massachusetts
1989 births